Pottanmala  is a place in Kuttoor village in the Indian state of Kerala. Kuttoor panchayathu is under Thiruvalla. Pottanmala is a historical place and the name came from the relation with Dritharashtra. It was formally known as Dritharashtramala.

Demographics
At the 2001 India census, Kuttoor had a population of 18,433.

References

Villages in Pathanamthitta district